Caravela is the northernmost island of the Bissagos Islands of Guinea-Bissau, part of the Sector of Caravela, which also includes the islands Carache, Maio, Ponta and Formosa. The population of the sector is 4,263, the population of the island is 907 (2009 census). The area of the island is 128 km2, its length is 19.3 km and its width is 10 km. The island is heavily forested with mangroves. It has white, sandy beaches. Caravela has a small airfield. The island Carache lies to its southeast.

References 

Bolama Region
Bissagos Islands
Sectors of Guinea-Bissau
Populated places in Guinea-Bissau